This is a list of Curaçao national football team games in 2016.

2016 games

References 

2016
2016 national football team results
2015–16 in Curaçao football
2016–17 in Curaçao football